Harold Scott (21 April 1891 – 15 April 1964) was an English actor of stage and screen.

His stage work ran from the 1910s to the 1960s, and included the original West End productions of The Constant Nymph (1926–1927), Grand Hotel (1931–1932), Waters of the Moon (1951–1953) and Agatha Christie's Spider's Web (1954–1956).

Scott's television appearances included The Children of the New Forest, ITV Television Playhouse, BBC Sunday Night Theatre, The New Adventures of Charlie Chan, William Tell, Armchair Theatre, Maigret, Dixon of Dock Green, The Avengers and Martin Chuzzlewit.

Filmography 

 The Water Gipsies (1932) as Mr Bell
 Discord (1933) as Harold
 Return of a Stranger (1937) as Peters
  Edward, My Son (1949) as Coppingham (uncredited)
 Trottie True (1949) as Mr True
  No Place for Jennifer (1950) as Man in underground
 The Woman with No Name (1950) as Waiter
 The 20 Questions Murder Mystery (1950) as Maurice Emery KC
 Stop the Merry-Go-Round (1952) as Man in pub
 Who Done it? (1956) as Scientist
 The Spanish Gardener (1956) as Pedro
 The Brides of Dracula (1960) as Severin (uncredited)
 The Hand (1960) as Charlie Taplow
 Clue of the Silver Key (1961) as Crow
 The Young Ones (1961) as Dench
 The Boys (1962) as Caldwell
 The Man Who Finally Died (1963) as Professor
 The Yellow Rolls-Royce (1964) as Taylor

References

External links 

 

1891 births
1964 deaths
English stage actors
English film actors
English television actors